The 2007 Norwegian Figure Skating Championships was held in Asker from January 12 to 14, 2007. Skaters competed in the discipline of single skating. The results were used to choose the teams to the 2007 World Championships, the 2007 European Championships, the 2007 Nordic Championships, and the 2007 World Junior Championships.

Senior results

Men

External links
 
 results 

Norwegian Figure Skating Championships
Norwegian Figure Skating Championships, 2007
2007 in Norwegian sport